Distributed Management Task Force (DMTF) is a 501(c)(6) nonprofit industry standards organization that creates open manageability standards spanning diverse emerging and traditional IT infrastructures including cloud, virtualization, network, servers and storage. Member companies and alliance partners collaborate on standards to improve interoperable management of information technologies.

Based in Portland, Oregon, the DMTF is led by a board of directors representing technology companies including: Broadcom Inc., Cisco, Dell Technologies, Hewlett Packard Enterprise, Intel Corporation, Lenovo, NetApp, Positive Tecnologia S.A., and Verizon.

History
Founded in 1992 as the Desktop Management Task Force, the organization's first standard was the now-legacy Desktop Management Interface (DMI). As the organization evolved to address distributed management through additional standards, such as the Common Information Model (CIM), it changed its name to the Distributed Management Task Force in 1999,  but is now known as, DMTF.

The DMTF continues to address converged, hybrid IT and the Software Defined Data Center (SDDC) with its latest specifications, such as the Redfish standard, SMBIOS and PMCI standards.

Standards

DMTF standards include:

 CADF - Cloud Auditing Data Federation
 CIMI - Cloud Infrastructure Management Interface
 CIM - Common Information Model
 DASH - Desktop and Mobile Architecture for System Hardware
 MCTP - Management Component Transport Protocol Including NVMe-MI™, I2C/SMBus and PCIe® Bindings
 NC-SI - Network Controller Sideband Interface
 OVF - Open Virtualization Format
 PLDM - Platform Level Data Model Including Firmware Update, Redfish Device Enablement (RDE)
 Redfish – Including Protocols, Schema, Host Interface, Profiles
 SMASH - Systems Management Architecture for Server Hardware
 SMBIOS - System Management BIOS

See also
 Cloud Infrastructure Management Interface
 Common Information Model (computing)
 Desktop and mobile Architecture for System Hardware
 Management Component Transport Protocol
 NC-SI
 Open Virtualization Format
 Redfish (specification)
 Systems Management Architecture for Server Hardware
 System Management BIOS

References

General
https://www.theregister.co.uk/2015/08/05/dmtf_signs_off_redfish_server_management_spec_v_10/
https://digitalisationworld.com/news/49120/dmtf-announces-redfish-api-advancements
https://searchstorage.techtarget.com/tip/Choose-the-right-storage-management-interface-for-you

External links
 

Technology trade associations
DMTF standards
Information technology organizations
Network management
Standards organizations in the United States
Working groups
Task forces